Mace Moulton (May 2, 1796 – May 5, 1867) was an American sheriff, banker and Democratic politician in the U.S. State of New Hampshire. He served as a United States representative from New Hampshire and as sheriff of Hillsborough County during the 1800s.

Early life and career
Moulton was born in Concord, New Hampshire, the son of Henry and Susan Stevens Moulton. He attended the public schools and trained as a carpenter's apprentice. In 1817, he was appointed deputy sheriff of Hillsborough County and moved to Bedford, New Hampshire.  He served as deputy sheriff until 1840, when he was appointed sheriff. Moulton served as sheriff until he resigned in 1844.

He was elected as a Democrat to the Twenty-ninth Congress, serving from March 4, 1845 - March 3, 1847. After leaving Congress, Moulton served as sheriff again from 1847 to 1849. He was appointed a member of the Governor's council in 1848 and 1849.

In 1849, he moved to Manchester, New Hampshire where he served as director and president of the Amoskeag Savings Bank until his death in 1867. Moulton died in Manchester, New Hampshire and is interred in Valley Cemetery in Manchester.

Personal life
Moulton married Dolly Gould Stearns in 1822 and they had three children: Eliza Jennie, a daughter, and two sons, Henry DeWitt and Charles Lucian Moulton.  Henry DeWitt Moulton was the father of Mace Moulton, namesake of the Hon. Mace Moulton, and a civil engineer.

References

External links
 

	

1796 births
1867 deaths
Politicians from Concord, New Hampshire
Politicians from Manchester, New Hampshire
People from Bedford, New Hampshire
Democratic Party members of the United States House of Representatives from New Hampshire
New Hampshire sheriffs
19th-century American politicians